The Lebanese Premier League 2006–07 season was the 46th season in the Lebanese Premier League. Al-Ansar won the 13th and so far latest title in the Lebanese Premier League by flying to the end of the season, 4 points clear of the nearest team, Safa Sporting Club and winning 2 consecutive titles.

Final table

Relegation and promotion

Relegation to 2nd Division 
Al Rayyan(Finished 2nd Last)
Salam Zgharta(Finished Last)

Promotion to Lebanese Premier League 
Racing Beirut(Won 2nd Division)
Al-Irshad(Won Promotion Play-off)

References

External links
Rec.Sport.Soccer.Statistics.Foundation
Lebanese Football.com
goalzz Website

Lebanese Premier League seasons
Leb
1
2006–07 Lebanese Premier League